Marshall A. Barber was a physician who studied malaria affiliated with the Rockefeller Foundation and the University of Kansas. He proposed the technique of microinjection to clone bacteria. He developed micropipette methods in 1904 for microscopic renal physiology. He also worked with the U.S. military on public health issues, offering his advice during both World Wars. He earned 3 degrees from Harvard. He graduated from the University of Kansas in 1891, received his Master's from Harvard in 1894, taught botany and bacteriology at Kansas, and went to the Philippines in 1911. In 1915 he went to Malaysia with the Rockefeller Foundation. In 1913 while working in Manila he may have been the first to discover mastitis in dairy cattle while experimenting on himself.

References 

American public health doctors
Malariologists
American tropical physicians
Human subject research in the United States
American medical researchers
American pathologists
Harvard Medical School alumni
United States Army Medical Corps officers